Xanthippus is a genus of band-winged grasshoppers in the family Acrididae. There are about six described species in Xanthippus.

Species
These six species belong to the genus Xanthippus:
 Xanthippus aquilonius Otte, 1984 i c g b
 Xanthippus brooksi Vickery, 1967 i c g b
 Xanthippus corallipes (Haldeman, 1852) i c g b (red-shanked grasshopper)
 Xanthippus montanus (Thomas, 1871) i c g b (sandhills band-wing grasshopper)
 Xanthippus olancha (Caudell, 1921) i c g
 Xanthippus sierra (Saussure, 1884) b (sierra grasshopper)
Data sources: i = ITIS, c = Catalogue of Life, g = GBIF, b = Bugguide.net

References

Further reading

External links

 

Oedipodinae